Mare Kandre (27 May 1962 in Söderala – 24 March 2005) was a Swedish writer of Estonian descent. She was born on May 27, 1962 in Söderala, a small place in mid-Sweden and grew up in Gothenburg and Stockholm. Between 1967 and 1969, she lived with her family in British Columbia, Canada, a period which made a very deep impression on her and later in life influenced her writing. She died on 24 March 2005 of an unintentional prescription drug overdose, aged 42. 

Mare Kandre achieved considerable acclaim in Scandinavia and her works have been translated into more than eight languages. Her novels, short stories and prose poetry often deals with children's, in particular girls', development to adulthood; women's roles; and marginalized and traumatized individuals who opt to break with society's expectations.

Mare Kandre's stories have a marked metaphysical dimension which is strengthened by her poetical language and representation, with existential themes paired with contemporary social issues. In her writing she often returns to issues like the expectations placed on women, how alienation develops, and the significance of instincts. Several of her books were influenced by Gothic fiction.

Before Mare Kandre entered onto the path of writing, she was the frontwoman for the music group Global Infantilists (1981-1983).

Works
I ett annat land (In Another Country): prose (1984)
Bebådelsen (The Annunciation): prose poetry (1986)
Bübins unge (Bübin's kid): novel (1987). Translated into Serbian 2010, titled Bimbinino dete
Det brinnande trädet (The Burning Tree): novel (1988) 
Aliide, Aliide : novel (1991). Translated into Danish, Norwegian and German with the same title
Deliria : novel (1992)
Quinnan och Dr Dreuf (The Woman and Dr Dreuf) : novel (1994). Translations: Danish, titled: Quinden og doktor Dreuf, French, titled: La femme et le docteur Dreuf Russian, titled Женщина и доктор Дpeйф and Estonian, titled Naene ja Dr Dreuf
Djävulen och Gud (The Devil and God): novel (1994). Slovakian translation: Diabol a Boh. German translation: http://www.septime-verlag.at/Buecher/buch_der_teufel_und_gott.html
Bestiarium : novel (1999)
Hetta och vitt (Heat and White): short stories (2001) 
Xavier: novel (2002) 

Mare Kandre also wrote drama. Of these Vilse ("Lost") has been staged by several theatres.

Prizes and distinctions
Scholarship, The Swedish Academy (1984)
Scholarship, The Swedish Authors' Fund (1985)
Aftonbladet's literature prize (1991) 
Alfred Bonnier's Centennial Award (1991)
De Nios Vinterpris (The Nine's Winter Prize) (1996)
The Kalleberger scholarship, The Swedish Academy (1999)
Göteborgs-Posten's literature prize (2000)
Award, Alfred Bonnier's Fund for Swedish Writers (2001)
The Dobloug prize, The Swedish Academy (2003)
Mare Kandre also held a long-term writer scholarship from The Swedish Writers’ Union

Further reading

External links
Mare Kandre - the official web site  
Steve Sem-Sandberg Mare Kandre hade bråttom att få fram bilden, Under Strecket, SvD April 21, 2005 
 Writer presentation, Bonniers publishing house 
Mare Kandre död - DN March 31, 2005. 
Författaren Mare Kandre har avlidit - SvD March 31, 2005.  

Writer presentation by the English translator Eric Dickens 

This article is fetched from :sv:Mare Kandre

1962 births
2005 deaths
People from Söderhamn Municipality
Swedish people of Estonian descent
Swedish women writers
Writers from Hälsingland
Dobloug Prize winners
Drug-related deaths in Sweden